М5 highway connects Minsk with Homieĺ. It is a part of European route E271. The highway is around 296 km long. It shares first 12 km with the M4 motorway, branches off it near Privolnyi and runs south-east. Near Babrujsk it crosses with many regional roads. Near Homieĺ it connects to the M8 highway. All road is dual carriageway.

Roads in Belarus 
International road networks

fi:M5 (Valko-Venäjä)